Castellero is a comune (municipality) in the Province of Asti in the Italian region Piedmont, located about  southeast of Turin and about  northwest of Asti.

Castellero borders the following municipalities: Baldichieri d'Asti, Monale, and Villafranca d'Asti.

Demographic evolution

References

Cities and towns in Piedmont